Nicole Regnier Palacios (born 28 February 1995) is a Colombian footballer who plays as a forward for La Equidad and Colombia.

Career
She was a member of the Colombia women's national under-17 football team, playing in the 2012 South American Under-17 Women's Football Championship.

Spain
She played for Atlético Madrid Féminas B of Segunda División (group 5).
She played for Rayo Vallecano in the Primera División.

Career statistics

International

International appearances

Under-20

International goals

Under-20

|}

References

1995 births
Living people
Footballers from Cali
Colombian women's footballers
Women's association football forwards
Rayo Vallecano Femenino players
América de Cali (women) players
Colombia women's international footballers
Olympic footballers of Colombia
Footballers at the 2016 Summer Olympics
Colombian expatriate women's footballers
Colombian expatriate sportspeople in Spain
Expatriate women's footballers in Spain
Colombian expatriate sportspeople in Switzerland
Expatriate women's footballers in Switzerland
21st-century Colombian women